Her Private Life is a 2019 South Korean television series, created by Kim Hye-young and directed by Hong Jong-chan, starring Park Min-young and Kim Jae-wook. Developed by Studio Dragon and produced by Bon Factory Worldwide, the show is based on a web novel called Noona Fan Dot Com written by Kim Sung-yeon and published in 2007. The series aired on tvN from April 10 to May 30, 2019.

Synopsis
Sung Deok-mi (Park Min-young) is a talented chief curator of Cheum Museum of Art, who also happens to have a secret: she is a fanatic fangirl of White Ocean's Cha Shi-an (Jung Jae-won). In addition, she is also the fansite manager of the famous "The Road to Sian", the abbreviation of which  she uses as her screen name. Ryan Gold (Kim Jae-wook) is a standoffish artist who develops Stendhal syndrome, eventually retiring as an artist. After the current boss, Uhm So-hye (Kim Sun-young), is investigated for embezzlement, Ryan Gold becomes the new Art Director of Cheum Museum of Art.

After unfounded rumors break out claiming Deok-mi and Shi-an are dating, Ryan suggests he and Deok-mi pretend to date to ward off Shi-an's fans who threaten to harm her. However, Kim Hyo-jin (Kim Bo-ra), Um So-hye’s spoiled daughter who, unknown to her mother (who would strongly disapprove), is another fansite manager of Cha Shi-an under the pseudonym Sindy, manages to land a job as an intern in the museum seeking to prove Ryan and Deok-mi are a fake couple, leaving them both no choice but to continue the act even at work. Eventually, they fall in love.

Cast

Lead Characters 
 Park Min-young as Sung Deok-mi / Sinagil
Park So-yi as young Sung Deok-mi
The chief curator at Cheum Museum of Art who often does not get credit for the work she does under Director Uhm, an incompetent socialite. She runs a fan website called "The Road to Sian" which she intends on keeping secret. She later falls in love with Ryan.
 Kim Jae-wook as Ryan Gold / Heo Yoon-je
Choi Go as young Ryan Gold
The standoffish new art director of Cheum Museum of Art who is very strict and he is allergic to caffeine. After seeing Lee Sol's painting, he develops Stendhal syndrome which prohibits him from painting, eventually leading to his retirement. He is also famous in New York for his perspective on new artists. He eventually falls in love with Deok-mi.

Supporting Characters 
People around Sung Deok-mi
Ahn Bo-hyun as Nam Eun-gi
Yang Hee-won as young Nam Eun-gi
An Olympic silver medalist in judo who opens his own gym and becomes an instructor. After his single mother abandoned him in the hospital, Deok-mi's mother took him in and raised him with Deok-mi as family.
 Park Jin-joo as Lee Seon-joo
 Deok-mi's best friend who is the owner of CocoMoco café which Deok-mi, Ryan, and Eun-gi frequents. Like Deok-mi, she is also a fangirl of Cha Shi-an who often voices her sadness  she can no longer be a full-time fan after becoming a mother. She helps with the creation of Ryan and Deok-mi's fake relationship. After seeing her employee, Joo-hyuk, at a concert, she becomes a fan and makes and runs a fan site for him.
 Kim Mi-kyung as Go Young-sook
Deok-mi's mother who is a knitting-obsessed woman who is often portrayed as a head of the household. She urges Deok-mi to give up being a fangirl, citing it would be difficult for her to date since men would find her hobby off-putting. Not knowing Ryan and Deok-mi's relationship is fake, she becomes ecstatic and treats Ryan as her future son-in-law, inviting him for dinner and giving him side-dishes.
 Maeng Sang-hoon as Sung Geun-ho
Deok-mi's father who is a quiet, soft-spoken man who began collecting suiseki stones after his business failed. He is completely immersed in taking care of his rocks which annoys his wife.
  as Nam Se-yeon
A chief editor of an art magazine and mother of Nam Eun-gi. After having personal troubles, she lets Young-sook care for her son since he was an infant. Young-sook and Se-yeon becomes friends and have accepted that they are both the mother of Eun-gi. Although she has a good relationship with her son, he often calls her as "Editor Nam" and Young-sook as "Mom", which she doesn't seem to mind.

People around Ryan Gold
 Hong Seo-young as Choi Da-in
A visual art director from New York who is in love with Ryan, her friend of ten years. She follows Ryan and moves to South Korea. She works at Cheum Museum of Art in collaboration with Cha Shi-an for his upcoming album and art exhibition. Feeling dejected learning about Ryan and Deok-mi's relationship, she becomes happy after Eun-gi tells her their relationship is fake.
 Jung Jae-won as Cha Shi-an / Sian (stage name)
An idol and the most popular member of the boy group, White Ocean. He adores the fansite "The Road to Sian", stating that it is the only fansite whose owner seems to understand him. He is a fan of artist Lee Sol and plans on collecting all of her nine paintings. He grew close to Ryan Gold after learning that they were neighbors.
 Lee Il-hwa as Gong Eun-young / Lee Sol
A retired artist who caused Ryan Gold's Stendhal syndrome and she is Ryan's biological mother.

Cheum Museum of Art
 Kim Sun-young as Uhm So-hye
A wealthy and eccentric former art director of Cheum Museum of Art who resigned after her investigation of embezzlement and slush funds. Despite resigning, she plans on taking back her position after the investigation is completed. She remains a powerful authority in the museum after becoming the head director of TK Cultural Foundation, which funds the museum. She uses her connections to get her daughter, Sindy, a job in Cheum Museum of Art as an intern.
 Kim Bo-ra as Sindy / Kim Hyo-jin
An investigative intern in Cheum Museum of Art and the daughter of the former art director, Uhm So-hye. She is a fan of Cha Shi-an and runs a fansite called "Sindy" where she calls out Deok-mi as Shi-an's girlfriend. After an article comes out reporting that Ryan and Deok-mi are dating. Hyo-jin uses her mother's connections to get a job in Cheum Museum of Art. She makes another site called "CUPATCH" where she investigates the validity of Ryan and Deok-mi's relationship. Eventually, it is shown how she becomes a part of the Cheum Museum family through her determination, creativity and hard work.
 as Secretary Kim
So-hye's secretary who often helps to hide Hyo-jin's fangirling activities from her mother.
 Seo Ye-hwa as Yoo Kyung-ah
  as Kim Yoo-seob

Others
 Im Ji-kyu as Kang Seung-min
Seon-joo's husband who is a television documentary series director who hopes to switch to variety shows after the release of his current documentary.
 Jung Si-yul as Kang Geon-woo
 Seon-joo's son
 Yoo Yong-min as Joo-hyuk
Seon-joo's part-time employee who often breaks cups while working. He is the vocalist and guitarist of an underground band called Fade.

Special appearances
 IN2IT as other members of idol group White Ocean (Ep. 1)
Hyunuk
Inho
Inpyo
Jiahn
 as Ryan Gold's senior and psychiatrist (Ep. 1)
Kim Young-ok as Deok-mi's grandmother (Ep. 4)
 Seo Sang-won as Noh Suk, a writer who is Yoon Tae-hwa's friend (Ep. 5)
 as Latte, Ryan Gold's avatar (Ep. 5, 9)
 Jung Soo-young as fortune teller possessed by French spirit (Ep. 7)
  as MC of Cha Shi-an's autograph session (Ep. 7)
 Lee Han-wi as Kim Moo-san, Uhm So-hye's husband (Ep. 16)

Production
 The first script reading was held on February 25, 2019 with the attendance of the cast and crew.
 It is the second time that Kim Mi-kyung portrays Park Min-young's mother in a television series, after Sungkyunkwan Scandal (2010).

Original soundtrack

Part 1

Part 2

Part 3

Part 4

Part 5

Part 6

Part 7

Viewership

Awards and nominations

References

External links
  
 
 

TVN (South Korean TV channel) television dramas
Korean-language television shows
2019 South Korean television series debuts
2019 South Korean television series endings
South Korean romantic comedy television series
Television shows based on South Korean novels
Television series by Studio Dragon
Television series by Bon Factory Worldwide